Ogie Banks (born June 13, 1973) is an American voice actor. He is best known for his roles as Clawd Wolf in Monster High, and Luke Cage and Miles Morales in Ultimate Spider-Man. He also voices Dylan in the Bratz franchise and Omoi in Naruto.

Filmography

Anime

Film

Television

Video games

Sources:

References

External links
 
 

Living people
American male voice actors
American male film actors
American male video game actors
American male stage actors
African-American male actors
American male television actors
20th-century American male actors
21st-century American male actors
20th-century African-American people
21st-century African-American people
1973 births